Hyposmocoma lignivora is a species of moth of the family Cosmopterigidae. It was first described by Arthur Gardiner Butler in 1879. It is endemic to the Hawaiian islands of Oahu and Molokai. This is a common and widely distributed moth on Oahu.

This was the first endemic species of Hawaiian microlepidoptera to be described.

The larvae are common in rotten wood and under dead bark of various trees, native and introduced, including Pisonia, Tetraplasandra and Wikstroemia. True lignivora appears to occur on Oahu and Molokai, but associated distinct forms evidently also occur on Molokai and perhaps on Oahu.

The larvae live in large brown cases. The cases are often found in large numbers beneath the bark of dead trees.

External links

lignivora
Endemic moths of Hawaii
Biota of Oahu
Biota of Molokai